Results from Norwegian football (soccer) in the year 1909.

Class A of local association leagues
Class A of local association leagues (kretsserier) is the predecessor of a national league competition. The champions qualify for the 1909 Norwegian cup.

Norwegian Cup

First round

|colspan="3" style="background-color:#97DEFF"|18 September 1909

Lyn had a walkover.
Teknikerne had a walkover.

Semi-finals

|colspan="3" style="background-color:#97DEFF"|25 September 1909

Final

References

External links
RSSSF Football Archive

 
Seasons in Norwegian football